Barbara Yung Mei-ling (7 May 1959 – 14 May 1985) was a  famous Hong Kong actress during the early 1980s. Yung died of suicide by gas inhalation at the age of 26, during the peak of her career.Her most popular acting role was Huang Rong in The Legend of the Condor Heroes and was named as one of the Seven Fairies of TVB

Education
Yung was born in Hong Kong on 7 May 1959 to a civil service family as an only child. Her childhood was relatively uneventful until the death of her father when she was aged 7.

At 15, Yung left Hong Kong for England in late 1974 to join her mother who had migrated to the United Kingdom (TVB K100 Feature Interview, 1985). Yung, her mother and a family friend, whom Yung considered her "uncle", first moved to Barkingside, Ilford, near London. According to her interview with K100, she took a grammar school exam on her arrival in the U.K. and successfully entered Ilford County High School for Girls, which was eventually become a better known as Valentines High School started in 1977 (An outstanding rating school from OFSTED nowadays). Together as a family, they later settled in Histon, a small village in Cambridge. There, the adults operated a small fish and chips shop where Yung helped out during the weekends.。

While in Hong Kong, Yung attended Rosaryhill School (located at Stubbs Road in Hong Kong), where she had completed her primary and some of her secondary education through Form 4 (TVB K100, 1985). She continued with her GCE O levels at a secondary school in Cambridge. After the completion of her 'O' levels, she was admitted to a 2-year foundations program at the Anglia Ruskin University (CCAT). Upon the completion of this program, she went to London to study textile design at the Central School of Art and Design. She spent 4 years at this school and graduated with a bachelor's degree (TVB K100 Feature Interview, 1985).

Career
Yung returned to Hong Kong and joined the Miss Hong Kong pageant in 1982, in which she was awarded 8th place. After the pageant, she was offered an acting contract by TVB. She made her acting debut in 1982, in a Cantonese wuxia series named Sup Sam Mui also known as The Legend of the Unknowns set in the Qing dynasty, co-starring Kent Tong and Simon Yam in which Yung played a Manchu princess, Princess Sheung (TVB K100 Feature Interview, 1985). This was the TV drama that shot her into the limelight. Although Yung played a relatively minor role in this drama, she managed to gain TVB's confidence to cast her in what would become the drama (The Legend of the Condor Heroes) that would make her a household name in Hong Kong, Singapore, China, Taiwan, Malaysia, Indonesia, Thailand, Vietnam and other countries with sizeable especially Cantonese-speaking populations in the 1980s. Her popularity persists through present day due to her lead role in The Legend of the Condor Heroes, earning her the title of the "Huang Rong Forever". (TVB K100 Feature Interview, 1985).

Rise to fame
Yung's most famous TVB swordplay series was The Legend of the Condor Heroes in which she portrayed the character Wong Yung. TVB made several costumed/period dramas in the 1980s based on famous martial arts swordplay novels by Louis Cha. Cha's The Legend of the Condor Heroes, has been adapted numerous times to TV dramas and film, but none has attained a popularity as the one made by TVB in 1983. The innocent swordsman, Kwok Ching was played by Felix Wong. The cast in this edition also featured Michael Miu, Sharon Yeung, Patrick Tse and Louise Lee  
and become one of the most watched TVB series by Chinese people in Hong Kong, Southeast Asia and around the world.

In 1984, "The Fearless Duo" was also the highest-rated drama series in 1984, The drama has an average rating of 61, which shows Weng Meiling's popularity at that time.

Yung's other TV dramas included The Foundation, The Man in the Middle, The Fearless Duo, United We Stand, The New Adventures of Chor Lau-heung, The Rough Ride and The Battlefield.

Death
Yung was found unconscious due to gas inhalation in her apartment on Broadcast Drive, Kowloon on the morning of 14 May 1985 (Spiritus Temporis, 2007). According to her friend and actor (who was rumoured to have begun courting Yung), Stephen Chow Sai-lung, Yung had called him on the night of 13 May 1985. Chow asserted that she was troubled by her failing relationship with Kent Tong Chun-yip. After hanging up, Chow was concerned and he went to her home. However, he could not gain entrance to her apartment. He then thought that nobody was home and subsequently left.

Chow returned to Yung's apartment on the morning of 14 May 1985. He knocked on Yung's door again but no one answered. Chow said he smelled gas fumes through Yung's apartment door. He then climbed up the exterior apartment building wall to her second floor apartment and pried open her front window. He entered Yung's apartment (from the window) and discovered her unconscious and sprawled on the living room floor. Chow immediately alerted the building's security and police. Yung was rushed to the nearby Baptist Hospital in Kowloon where she was pronounced dead on arrival.

There were many rumours regarding the cause of her death. Some had attributed it to an accident, suicide or perhaps even foul play. One of the most widely circulated rumours was that her suicide was the result of her depression over her supposed broken relationship with then-TVB actor, Kent Tong Chun-yip. (In an interview conducted by a Hong Kong radio station on 14 March 1985, when asked about rumours regarding her relationship with Kent Tong Chun-yip, Yung had explained that he was merely a friend and respected colleague.) The rumours concerning the association of her death with Kent Tong Chun-yip were largely based on Stephen Chow's account of her last 24 hours. There were also rumours which claimed that Stephen Chow was Yung's boyfriend. According to Yung's TVB colleagues, she behaved normally in the days before the suicide and did not appear depressed or suicidal. Yung sounded very optimistic about her future in her radio interviews both on 14 March 1985 and one conducted two weeks before her death.

Yung did not leave a suicide note. At the time of her death, Yung was involved in filming the final chapters of the TVB drama, The Battlefield. Filming was due to conclude in June 1985. She was to start shooting on a new drama called King of Ideas, alongside onscreen partner Kent Tong before her death. Her role was given to TVB local actor Maggie Cheung.

Yung's funeral was a big event and was attended by throngs of fans and many prominent Hong Kong celebrities. Her remains were placed in the World Funeral Parlor, Hung Hom, Kowloon for fans and friends to pay their final respect. Her friends and co-stars in her TV dramas such as Michael Miu, Felix Wong, Tony Leung Chiu-wai, and Andy Lau were pallbearers for her casket. Yung had a Catholic funeral. She was cremated in Hong Kong on 19 May 1985 and her ashes were brought back and laid to rest at the Cambridge City Cemetery in Cambridge, England.

Grave stone
Yung's grave stone in Cambridge city cemetery continues to be visited by Chinese fans who remember her role in the 1983 Condor Heroes production.  In 2017 the original white stone with black lettering was replaced by a dark stone with golden lettering that also marks the death of her mother (1926-2017).  The golden lettering on a dark background is common to several gravestones in the area, but Yung's stone is distinctive in that it is heart-shaped and includes black-and-white photographs of both individuals.

Filmography

Awards and Ranking
1983: Top Ten Star Golden Globe Awards 
1984: Top Ten Star Golden Globe Awards  
Ranked among the top ten in the "Tvb Superstar 100 Ranking" selected by Hong Kong TVB Guide Magazine
In 2007, she was selected as one of the Top Ten Classic TV Characters Hong Kong Apple Daily Selected Top 100 Classic TV Characters, and Barbara Yung role as Huang Rong In Legend of the Condor Heroes (1983 TV series), it won tenth place in the audience vote. (Source: Hong Kong Apple Daily, 17 November 2007, Issue C14&15)
TVB 55th Anniversary  Celebrating Hong Kong. Earlier, it launched the audience voting activity of "I Choose, I Want to Watch". In "Unforgettable..." and this drama, "The Fearless Duo" starring Barbara Yung and Michael Miu ( First broadcast in 1984) took the first place with 29.8% of the total votes.

References

External links

 

 Television Broadcasts. (1982). . Retrieved 12 August 2007
 Television Broadcasts. (1985). . Retrieved 12 August 2007
 YouTube. (2007). . Retrieved 12 August 2007
TVB K100 Feature Interview, Barbara Yung
 Barbara Yung at robertchaen.com

1959 births
1985 deaths
Alumni of Anglia Ruskin University
Alumni of the Central School of Art and Design
Hong Kong emigrants to England
Hong Kong film actresses
Hong Kong Roman Catholics
Hong Kong television actresses
Naturalised citizens of the United Kingdom
Suicides in Hong Kong
TVB actors
20th-century Hong Kong actresses
People from Histon and Impington
British film actresses
British television actresses
British actresses of Chinese descent
20th-century British actresses
Burials at the Cambridge City Cemetery
1985 suicides
20th-century British businesspeople